Donsbrüggen is a village in the municipality of Kleve, Kreis Kleve in the German State of North Rhine-Westphalia, with some 1,500 current residents.

References

Villages in North Rhine-Westphalia